Varstu is a small borough in Rõuge Parish, Võru County in southeastern Estonia. Between 1991 and 2017 (until the administrative reform of Estonian municipalities) the it was the administrative centre of Varstu Parish.

Varstu is the birthplace of historian Vello Helk (1923–2014).

See also
Varstu Airfield

References

External links 
Satellite map at Maplandia.com

Boroughs and small boroughs in Estonia